Tokachi Plain is a plain facing the Pacific Ocean, located in the southeastern part of Hokkaido. The area of the plain is approximately 3600km.

References 

Plains of Japan
Landforms of Hokkaido